Jere W. Schuler  is a former Republican member of the Pennsylvania House of Representatives.

He is a 1952 graduate of J. P. McCaskey High School. He earned a degree from Millersville University in 1956 and a M.Ed. degree from Temple University in 1962.

He was first elected to represent the 43rd legislative district in the Pennsylvania House of Representatives in 1982, a position he held until his retirement prior to the 2002 elections.

References

External links
 official PA House profile (archived)

Living people
Republican Party members of the Pennsylvania House of Representatives
1934 births